Kris Meeke (born 2 July 1979) is an Irish professional rally driver, best known for competing in the FIA World Rally Championship (WRC). He was the 2009 Intercontinental Rally Challenge champion. His co-driver is Seb Marshall
. He began his career as a Computer Aided Designer with M-Sport, at the headquarters of the Ford World Rally Team, before moving on to competing in the Peugeot Super 106 Cup in 2001.

In 2011, Meeke debuted in the World Rally Championship driving a MINI for Prodrive. His first event was the Rally d'Italia Sardegna which was held between 5–8 May. Meeke scored his first WRC points and won the Power Stage at the 2011 Rally Catalunya. His maiden WRC win was at the 2015 Rally Argentina.

Career
Meeke, son of rally engineer Sydney Meeke, was born in Dungannon, Northern Ireland and educated at the Royal School Dungannon. He later went on to study at Queen's University, Belfast, where he obtained a degree in mechanical engineering. He initially worked for M-Sport as a computer aided designer. He took his first step into rallying in 2000, when he won a Peugeot competition for new rally drivers. 

His debut event was the Bulldog Rally held in North Wales, even leading the event for a time. After mixed results, his first victory came on the third round of the 2001 Peugeot Super 106 Cup, the Swansea Bay Festival National Rally. In early 2002, Meeke's career was boosted when he was taken under the wing of the late Colin McRae and contested the British Junior Championship in a Ford Puma. In June, Meeke won in his category in the Scottish Rally after a calculated drive overseen by McRae, and took second on the Jim Clark Rally, his first full tarmac event. Third position in the final round of the series was however enough for Meeke to claim the British Junior Rally Championship title in only his second season in the sport, as well as third in the British S1600 series.

Junior World Rally Championship
The following year, Meeke moved up to the Junior World Rally Championship (JWRC), driver an Opel Corsa run by Team Palmer. He made an impressive debut setting the fastest time on two of the final leg stages however a string of minor problems dropped Meeke down the order. He retired in the next rally and a potential second-place finish in Italy was lost after a crash. Shortly afterwards he claimed consolation by winning the British S1600 title. On the final round of the 2003 JWRC held in Britain, Meeke was running in 2nd place in the JWRC and in 17th position overall before being forced to retire after hitting a rock and rolling his car. 

Meeke kicked the 2004 season off in style by finishing 3rd in class in the Rally of Monte Carlo. He then took part in the British S1600 event in Wales as a shakedown for the next JWRC in Greece, winning the Welsh event along the way. The next two JWRC events in Greece and Turkey were marred by mechanical problems on the rough gravel terrain. He then took part in the Pirelli Rally in Tampere as shakedown for the next JWRC event in Finland, scoring a class win in Pirelli Rally. He was leading the Finnish JWRC event before a mistake caused him to crash and retire. A spirited drive saw him set seven fastest stage times and finish on the podium in second place.

Intercontinental Rally Challenge

In 2009, Meeke alongside co-driver Paul Nagle contested the Intercontinental Rally Challenge (IRC) in a Peugeot UK backed 207 S2000, run by the Belgian Kronos Racing team. He crashed out heavily on the Monte Carlo Rally but went on to win the next three rounds he competed in at Brazil, Portugal, and Belgium. He won the championship at the penultimate round by winning Rally Sanremo in Italy, after his closest rival Jan Kopecky crashed on the second stage.

Meeke finished off the season with a dominant win of the inaugural Rally Scotland, winning 7 of the 13 stages on the way to victory. He starred in a wave of adverts for the Peugeot 207 in 2009, with the tagline "He's Meeke, but he's not mild". For 2010, Meeke continued his successful partnership with Paul Nagle and Peugeot, competing in 10 rounds of the IRC.

World Rally Championship

Mini (2011)
On 2 September 2010, Autosport magazine announced that Meeke had signed for the Prodrive team that would run MINI World Rally Championship (WRC) return in 2011. Meeke scored his first WRC points and won the Power Stage at the 2011 Rally Catalunya. Meeke came close to gaining his maiden podium at the final round of the season, the 2011 Rally GB but spun on the Power Stage allowing Henning Solberg to take third place. 

Meeke appeared in an edition of the BBC show Top Gear in a challenge similar to that of Henning Solberg driving a rally car against the Norwegian Olympic Bobsleigh team. Meeke rallied a Mini John Cooper Works WRC on a downhill snow track in a race against skeleton competitor Amy Williams at the Lillehammer Olympic Bobsleigh and Luge Track. Williams raced down the bobsleigh track whilst Meeke's route ran downhill alongside. With Top Gear presenter James May as his "co-driver," Meeke set a time of 59.73 in the Mini, beating Williams who finished with a time of 1:01.04.

On 22 December 2011, Meeke was dropped from the Mini WRC Team for the following month's Monte Carlo Rally in a crisis within the Prodrive-run team over budget for the 2012 season.

Citroën (2013–2018)
Meeke returned to the WRC in the 2013 Rally Finland, driving for the Abu Dhabi Citroën Total World Rally Team as a stand in for Khalid Al Qassimi.

Meeke was running comfortably in fifth place and set for an impressive points earning finish on his WRC return before rolling in the final section of the penultimate stage of the rally. Meeke would once again drive a Citroën DS3 WRC in September during the 2013 Rally Australia taking the place of works driver Dani Sordo.
After completing his first full season in 2014 in the Citroën team, Meeks finished 7th in the standings with 4 podiums to his name. He remained with Citroën for 2015 alongside Mads Ostberg, with Sebastian Loeb also joining him in Monte Carlo. In Monte he finished 10th, winning 3 stages in the rally and the power stage among them. He won his maiden rally in Argentina, ending a 13-year drought of British winners of a WRC event. After winning, dedicated his win to 1995 World Champion Colin McRae, who supported him during his career until McRae's death in a helicopter crash in 2007. At the end of the 2015 season, Meeke finished 5th in the standings, just behind teammate Mads Ostberg, with 112 points to his name. On 16 December it was announced that Meeke would have a 3-year contract with Citroën, up until the end of 2018.

It was announced that Meeke would only compete in eight rounds in the 2016 season, in order to focus on development of the Citroën C3 WRC that would be introduced in 2017. Meeke won two rallies in 2016, in Portugal and in Finland, the latter breaking a record for the highest average speed in a WRC rally. Kris Meeke also became the first driver from United Kingdom to win the famous and fast Rally Finland. Meeke had hoped that his 2016 schedule would allow him to challenge for the 2017 title.

The opening two rounds of 2017 proved frustrating for Meeke, crashing out in Monte Carlo and finishing 12th in Rally Sweden. Meeke took a win in Rally Mexico, despite a mistake in the final kilometre. He had gone into the Power Stage with a 37.2 second lead over Sébastien Ogier, but slid off track on a fast right hander, ending up in a car park. The incident cut his lead to 13.8 seconds, Meeke rejoining the stage through a gap in a hedge.

Meeke led the next rally, the Tour de Corse, but retired from the lead with an engine problem on the Novella stage. At Rally Argentina, Meeke retired again. He rolled his C3 twice in the course of the rally, one of these times seeing the car rolling 14 times, which he described as "the biggest." He was replaced with Andreas Mikkelsen for Rally Poland, which team principal Yves Matton described as being 'in the best interests of the team."
Meeke returned for Rally Finland, but struggled for confidence and eventually finished eighth, whilst teammate Craig Breen challenged for a podium. This was followed up by a crash on the Thursday evening super special stage on Rallye Deutschland, ruining any chance of scoring points. He eventually retired on day 2 with a mechanical issue. However at the next round in Spain, Meeke took the lead from Andreas Mikkelsen on the second day, and steadily pulled away from the rest of the field to take a second victory of the season.

Meeke was retained by Citroën for the 2018 championship and was the only Citroën driver scheduled to contest all thirteen rallies. However, the team released him from his contract after six rounds following a series of crashes. Team principal Pierre Budar was critical of what he called an "excessively high" number of accidents that came about when Meeke took "unjustified risks" considering his position at the time of the accidents.

Toyota (2018–2019) 
On 17 October 2018, Toyota Gazoo Racing WRT announced Meeke would drive the Toyota Yaris World Rally Car.

On 27 November 2019 Meeke confirmed that he was leaving Toyota.

Rally victories

WRC victories

JWRC victories

IRC victories

Results

WRC results

JWRC results

IRC results

References

External links

1979 births
Intercontinental Rally Challenge drivers
Living people
Rally drivers from Northern Ireland
European Rallycross Championship drivers
World Rally Championship drivers
Dakar Rally drivers
People educated at the Royal School Dungannon
Citroën Racing drivers
Toyota Gazoo Racing drivers
Peugeot Sport drivers